Anthony C. Griffin (born March 1, 1960) is a board certified plastic surgeon member of the American Society of Plastic Surgeons and is a Fellow of the American College of Surgeons.
Dr. Griffin participated as one of the surgeons on ABC's series Extreme Makeover, and is the author of "Surgery Without Scars: A Worry-Free, Multi-Cultural Guide to Plastic Surgery Today".

He received his BA from Brown University and his MD from Washington University in St. Louis.

References

External links 
 ABC television website
 CV with date of birth

Living people
American plastic surgeons
Brown University alumni
Washington University School of Medicine alumni
Year of birth missing (living people)
1960 births